Highland Township is the name of three townships in the U.S. state of Indiana:

 Highland Township, Franklin County, Indiana
 Highland Township, Greene County, Indiana
 Highland Township, Vermillion County, Indiana

Indiana township disambiguation pages